Panizos is a Late Miocene caldera in the Potosí Department of Bolivia and the Jujuy Province of Argentina. It is part of the Altiplano-Puna volcanic complex of the Central Volcanic Zone in the Andes. 50 volcanoes active in recent times are found in the Central Volcanic Zone, and several major caldera complexes are situated in the area. The caldera is located in a difficult-to-access part of the Andes.

Panizos and the majority of these volcanoes are formed by the subduction of the oceanic Nazca Plate under the continental South American continental lithosphere. The caldera is located east of the main arc and is supplied chiefly by dacite magmas. Beneath Panizos lie Tertiary ignimbrites and a Paleozoic sedimentary basement.

It erupted during an event 6.71 ± 0.04 mya and was preceded by another ignimbrite 7.9 mya ago. The last activity is a lava flow 6.1 mya ago.

It has been referred to as an "ignimbrite shield".

Geography and structure 
The centre is located on the border between Argentina and Bolivia. It is a shield constructed from ignimbrites. Research in this region of the Andes is made difficult by physical and logistics issues. Cerro Guacha and La Pacana are among the few systems that were the subject of research. The Panizos ignimbrite is well exposed with little modification.

Cerro Panizos is part of the Central Volcanic Zone (CVZ) of the Andes, a belt of recent volcanism that runs from southern Peru into Chile and Argentina. 50 volcanoes in the belt have been identified as active in recent times. A major ignimbrite province called the Altiplano-Puna volcanic complex is associated with the area between 21° and 24° degrees southern latitude since 23 million years ago.

These domes form a ring structure with thin lava cover in its centre, which may be the rim of a collapse caldera formed in the later stages of the main Panizos eruption and filled by later eruption stages, as suggested by the outward dip of the lower unit of the Panizos Ignimbrite. It is constructed from ignimbrites with a slope of 1–3°. Three lava platforms with the names Cerro Chinchinjaran, Cerro Tucunquis and Cerro Anta Quevas are present. A pre-caldera lava structure in the south of the complex is known as Cerro Limitayoc, but it erupted lavas even after the Panizos ignimbrite was erupted. A depression is located just south of the lava dome group and may be a downsag caldera, likewise infilled by activity. The structure of the Panizos complex has been called an "ignimbrite shield".

Geology 
The volcanism in the area is triggered by the subduction of the Nazca plate beneath the South America plate; magmas formed from the subduction process trigger the melting of the crust. Volcanism in the area is heavily dominated by calderic silicic volcanics with volumes of  contrasting to less than  andesites.

The volcano is part of the so-called Tin belt, a territory in the Andes where large tin mineral deposits are found in granitic and extrusive rocks, formed from sulfidation reactions involving the numerous volcanoes in the area. Magmas in the territory are derived from crystal fractionation and were heavily modified by interactions with the crust that reaches a thickness of  beneath the Central Volcanic Zone.

Research by S. L. de Silva indicates that before 10 mya volcanic activity already existed north of 20°30' in form of the Oxaya and Altos de Pica ignimbrites. Changes in the subduction activity 12-10 mya caused a shortening and thickening of the crust in the central Andes and the formation of melt zones in the deeper crust, associated with the Quechua phase of Andean orogeny. Since 10.6 mya these rose to the surface, forming magma chambers and calderas. The eruptions of the Panizos ignimbrites coincide with major pulses in APVC activity.

Local 
The basement beneath Panizos is formed from two formations, Acoite and Peña Colorada. The former is a sedimentary layer, formed during arc development in the Paleozoic. The latter is Tertiary volcanic in origin, containing breccia, debris flow material, ignimbrites, lava flows and sandstone. The basement dips westward. Based on neodymium isotope ratios, some of the basement rocks are about one billion years old.

The volcano is part of a group with other volcanoes of the Lipez region. In this region, arc and back-arc volcanism occur in the same area and have generated some of the largest calderas in the world. These include Cerro Guacha, Pastos Grandes and Vilama. A meridional lineament of volcanoes including Limitayoc and Salle extends from the southern and western margin of the central lava domes to Cerro Pululu in the south. Another lineament may form the eastern rim of the lava dome complex. Other centres in the south are the Rose, Salle and West Zapaleri ignimbrites as well as the dacites of Cerro Bayo, all erupted 8.9–5.1 mya from the Vilama caldera. Cerro Panizos is associated with a large-scale topographic anomaly, similar to many other volcanic centres in the region.

Geologic record 
According to Turner (1978), the ignimbrites are part of the Lipiyoc formation and the lava dome structures of the Vicuñahuasi formation. The Panizos eruption products display strong local variations, with features at different depths and different distances from the central dome complex being very dissimilar.

It contains biotite, orthopyroxene, plagioclase and smaller amounts of quartz. Another tuff is found in Quebrada Cusi Cusi. Above these lies an eastward sloping layer of volcaniclastic material. The area covered by the Panizos products had been subject to earlier eruptive activity from unknown centres between 15.4–13.4 mya, generating tuffs recognized in the San Pablo de Lípez region as outcrops.

Changes in the subduction geometry since the late Miocene have caused volcanism to diminish from east to west, including cessation of activity at the Panizos centre. Uturuncu volcano was last active 271,000 years ago and the Cerro Chascon-Runtu Jarita complex 85,000 years ago.

Composition 
With the exception of some andesitic products, mostly lava flows, dacite is the main component of Panizos eruptive products. The rock matrix and clasts in the rock have similar minerals. Plagioclase is the main component of the lower cooling unit. Vesicles are rare in the Panizos ignimbrite, forming no more than 25%. Calling it "densely welded" is difficult at percentages of more than 10%. Pumice is also found, chemically it contains biotite, plagioclase, quartz and some orthopyroxene. In the lower units, tonalite and ilmenite are also found. The Cienago and Cusi Cusi ignimbrites both contain biotite, quartz, plagioclase and Cusi Cusi also sanidine.

The ignimbrites of Panizos are alumina- and potassium-rich and contain 61–66% SiO2. The Cienago ignimbrite has by one study the largest amount of SiO2 of all magmas of Panizos, whereas another indicates that the Cusi Cusi ignimbrite has the highest with 69%. The Cienago ignimbrites would have 63–65% and the Panizos ones 61–66%. Isotope analysis indicates high / ratios and high / and / ratios. These are associated with arc volcanism, unlike the much lower ratios found at Galan which are typical for intraplate volcanism. Along with the neodymium isotope ratios this suggests that Panizos magmas have a strong crustal component. Lead isotope ratios are comparable with these of Galan and La Pacana and are linked to the domain of the crust they are constructed on.

There are some compositional variations in various stages of volcanism at Cerro Panizos. The Cienago ignimbrite is a highly evolved magma. Magmas from the Panizos ignimbrite display only weak variations that may be linked to temperature differences in the magma chamber. The magmas of the Panizos ignimbrite underwent strong crystallization between eruptions and crystals are often heavily modified. The formation of all magmas was initiated by the interaction of mafic mantle melts with the crust. The mantle component is up to 50% of the main Panizos ignimbrite.

A notable feature of Cerro Panizos is the presence of so-called orbs, which are rocks with concentric layers of igneous material surrounding them. They are known from plutonic rocks, but orbs in erupted magmas are only known from Akagi volcano, Japan. In Panizos they are found in the upper part of the lower cooling unit of the Cerro Panizos ignimbrite and are associated with pumice and megacrysts in the surrounding rock. Buried within the ignimbrites and lavas, some orbs contain layers of biotite, bronzite, ilmenite and plagioclase around a centimetre-sized xenolith or orthopyroxene core. The layering is not disturbed by irregular shapes of the cores. These orbs most likely formed from material crystallizing around pre-existent cores during rapid changes in magma temperature that occurred shortly before the end of the first phase of the Cerro Panizos eruption through changes in magma water content. Opening of ring vents then delivered the orb-containing magma to the surface.

Climate and hydrography 
Panizos has an arid climate, although some stream erosion is visible. Some stream valleys are known, clockwise from northeast, as Quebrada Buenos Aires, Quebrada Cienago, Quebrada Paicone Quebrada Pupusayo, Quebrada Cusi Cusi, Quebrada Cuevas and Quebrada Garcia. The dissection is particularly pronounced on the Argentine side of the complex.

Oxygen isotopic analysis of magmas from other APVC centres support the notion that the area of the APVC has been subject to arid climate for the duration of its active phase.

Eruptive history 
Two ignimbrite eruptions have taken place in Panizos. A number of lava flows also formed. Volcanic activity took place in the Late Miocene. The main Cerro Panizos ignimbrite lies on top three older ignimbrite layers. Potassium-argon dating has yielded ages of 9.7 ± 0.4, 8.49 ± 0.2 and 9.4 mya. Dates often differ between newly established and old established dates, presumably due to xenolith contamination.

The Cusi Cusi tuff is 12.4 mya old or more than 10 million years old and has been associated with the Panizos centre. The first recorded ignimbrite in the area is named Quebrada Cienago ignimbrite after the valley where it is exposed. It contains biotite quartz dacite and is formed from four units, two ashfall deposits and two ignimbrite flows. Some of these have undergone reworking. It was emplaced 7.9 mya. After the emplacement of the Cienago ignimbrite, eruption of dacite lava flows continued.

Erupted 6.71 ± 0.04 mya, the Panizos ignimbrite proper is a complex structure with several cooling units and an interlayered pyroclastic deposit, which contains pumice, sandstone boulders up to two metres thick and has carved channels into the lower unit. The lower unit begins with one metre of lapilli and above it thick ignimbrite layers that become increasingly non-welded farther up with vapour phase components appearing. There was no prior Plinian fallout. Orbs and two differently coloured pumices are located in the upper section of the lower unit, with some xenoliths. The upper cooling unit contains two types of pumice, one strongly welded and the other weakly so, and is much richer in lithic fragments. The upper unit was erupted in several discrete flows from the central complex. Some pumice fall layers are embedded in the upper unit.

Based on the structure, the main Panizos ignimbrite was probably erupted in a steady eruption at first, from either one vent or several smaller ones in close association. Either a column collapse or a change in vent geometries triggered a temporary pause which separates the upper and lower cooling units. After a short timespan, the eruption restarted, this time through several eruption flows and a more unsteady regimen with a lower flow rate. Based on welding patterns, the eruption commenced in the southern sector later covered by lava domes and migrated northward. Calculations indicate that the main Panizos ignimbrite has minimum volumina of  outside of the calderas and  dense rock equivalent. This ignimbrite flow was of comparatively low fluidity, likely due to its high crystal content. The amount of vesicles present in the lower cooling unit is inferior to 20% of volume.

Above the Panizos ignimbrite, a lava flow platform and a set of lava domes were emplaced. A last manifestation is the Cerro La Ramada lava flow, with an age of 6.1 mya. A tephra layer found in the Coastal Cordillera and dated 6.66 ± 0.13 mya may also be linked to the Panizos complex. The much younger (1.9±0.2–1.7±0.5 mya) Laguna Colorada ignimbrite is sometimes called Panizos, generating confusion.

See also 
 Aguas Calientes caldera

References

Additional sources 
 

Andean Volcanic Belt
Calderas of Argentina
Calderas of Bolivia
Miocene calderas
Cerro Panizos
Pyroclastic shields
Subduction volcanoes
Supervolcanoes